The Libya women's national football team is the national football team of Libya.  It does not have FIFA recognition.  It is not ranked by FIFA.  There are development plans in the country to improve the state of women's football.

History

Background and development
Early development of the women's game at the time colonial powers brought football to the continent was limited as colonial powers in the region tended to take make concepts of patriarchy and women's participation in sport with them to local cultures that had similar concepts already embedded in them. The lack of later development of the national team on a wider international level symptomatic of all African teams is a result of several factors, including  limited access to education, poverty amongst women in the wider society, and fundamental inequality present in the society that occasionally allows for female specific human rights abuses.  When quality female football players are developed, they tend to leave for greater opportunities abroad. Continent wide, funding is also an issue, with most development money coming from FIFA, not the national football association. Future success for women's football in Africa is dependent on improved facilities and access by women to these facilities.  Attempting to commercialise the game and make it commercially viable is not the solution, as demonstrated by the current existence of many youth and women's football camps held throughout the continent.

The women's game is severely underdeveloped in Libya.  A project was in development in 2004 to try to improve the state of the game for women, mirroring a similar project done in Afghanistan. In 2006, there were 0 registered female players in the country.  That year, a committee was under development to better register and track female footballers. In 2006, there were no women's teams in the country. Football is played by girls aged 9 to 18 in school.   There were 0 registered female futsal players in 2006 though there are some unregistered female futsal players in the country. Rights to broadcast the 2011 Women's World Cup in the country were bought by Al Jazeera and Eurosport.

The national federation was created in 1962 and joined  FIFA in 1964.  Their kid includes green shirts, white shorts and green socks. In 2006, there were three staff members dedicated to working on women's football in the country.

In 2021 The Libyan Football Association, headed by Abdul Hakim Al-Shalmani, announced the launch of the first women’s league in the country’s history, and the actual start will be on the first of next September.

Beginnings
The Libya women's national team played its first international match...

The team
Until 1985, almost no country in the world had a women's national football team, including Libya who have not played in a FIFA sanctioned match . In 2006, a FIFA recognised senior A team did not official exist. In 2010, the country did not have a team competing in the African Women's Championships. The country did not have a team competing at the 2011 All Africa Games. , a team from Libya was not ranked in the world by FIFA.

Home stadium
The Libya women's national team play their home matches on...

Results and fixtures

 

The following is a list of match results in the last 12 months, as well as any future matches that have been scheduled.

2023

Coaching staff

Manager history
    Ramon Takala(2023-)

Players

Current squad
 The following players were named on date month year for the xxx tournament. tournament.
 Caps and goals accurate up to and including 30 October 2021.

Recent call-ups
The following players have been called up to a Libya  squad in the past 12 months.

Individual records

 Active players in bold, statistics correct as of 2020.

Most capped players

Top goalscorers

Managers

Competitive record
 Champions   Runners-up   Third place   Fourth place

FIFA Women's World Cup

*Draws include knockout matches decided on penalty kicks.

Olympic Games

*Draws include knockout matches decided on penalty kicks.

Africa Women Cup of Nations

(The former format was amended as it did not comply with MOS:FLAG as discussed here)
*Draws include knockout matches decided on penalty kicks.

African Games

Regional

UNAF Women's Tournament

Arab Women's Championship

Honours

All−time record against FIFA recognized nations
The list shown below shows the Libyan national women's football team all−time international record against opposing nations.
*As of xxxxxx after match against  xxxx. Update using wiki page still friendly match 1/1/2022
Key

Record per opponent
*As ofxxxxx after match against  xxxxx.
Key

The following table shows Sudan's all-time official international record per opponent:

See also
Sport in Libya
Football in Libya
Women's football in Libya
Libya women's national under-20 football team
Libya women's national under-17 football team

References

External links

َArabic women's national association football teams
 
African women's national association football teams
national